Phil(l)ip Joseph may refer to:
 Phil Joseph (born 1985), rugby league footballer
 Philip Joseph (politician), African American politician in Reconstruction-era Alabama
 Philip Joseph, Prince of Salm-Kyrburg (1709–1779), prince of Salm-Kyrburg, 1743–1779
Phillip Joseph, actor in Great Expectations (1981 TV serial)

See also